Spray (stylized as SPRay) is a video game developed by French studio Eko System and published by Tecmo. It was released exclusively for the Wii on December 2, 2008.

Gameplay 
The player controls the Spirited Prince Ray, who can summon liquid-shooting spirits, hence the title SPRay. Besides water, Ray also has control over spirits that shoot oil, slime, anti-matter, and vomit. The player attacks enemies with Ray's sword and with the spirits, which are also used to solve environmental puzzles and give Ray special abilities. For example, slime lets the player stick to walls while vomit can reveal hidden platforms.

Tecmo also stated that the game also contains a number of multi-player mini-games.

Reception 
The game received a 42% aggregate review rating on Metacritic, indicating "generally unfavorable reviews". Nintendo Power gave it a 3/10, criticizing it for an uncontrollable camera, poor controls and overall repetitiveness. IGN gave it 5.6/10, calling it a "poor man's Legend of Zelda" with sloppy and apathetic presentation and uninspired gameplay. Game Informer gave it a 7/10.

References 

2008 video games
Action-adventure games
North America-exclusive video games
Tecmo games
Video games developed in France
Wii games
Wii-only games
3D platform games
Fantasy video games
Eko Software games